The 1975 Kilkenny Intermediate Hurling Championship was the 11th staging of the Kilkenny Intermediate Hurling Championship since its establishment by the Kilkenny County Board in 1929.

The final was played on 31 August 1975 at Nowlan Park in Kilkenny, between Muckalee/Ballyfoyle Rangers and Graignamanagh, in what was their first meeting in a final. Muckalee/Ballyfoyle Rangers won the match by 4-11 to 1-09 to claim their first championship title.

Results

Semi-finals

Final

References

External links
 Kilkenny GAA website

Kilkenny Intermediate Hurling Championship
Kilkenny Intermediate Hurling Championship